Eriogonum heermannii is a species of wild buckwheat known by the common name Heermann's buckwheat. It is native to the southwestern United States from California to Utah where it grows on rocky slopes, desert flats, and dry washes.

Description
This shrub is quite variable in appearance, and there are a number of varieties. It may be a small, rounded patch ten centimeters wide or a sprawling bush up to two meters tall. It is an intricately branched, brambly plant having small woolly leaves scattered along its green to brown stems. The leaves do not persist long and leave behind a naked weedy form bearing very tiny flower clusters at nodes along the thin stems. Each cluster is less than three millimeters wide and holds white, yellow, or pink flowers.

External links
Jepson Manual Treatment - Eriogonum heermannii
Eriogonum heermannii - Photo gallery

heermannii
Flora of California
Flora of Nevada
Flora of Arizona
Flora of Utah
Flora of the Sierra Nevada (United States)
Natural history of the California chaparral and woodlands
Natural history of the California Coast Ranges
Natural history of the Mojave Desert
Natural history of the Transverse Ranges
Flora without expected TNC conservation status